Wolf Kahlen (born 7 January 1940 in Aachen, Rhine Province) is a  German video artist who has been exhibiting since the 1960s. Since 1982 he has been a professor of intermedia art at the Technical University in Berlin.

Career 
Wolf Kahlen began studying at the Braunschweig School of Art in 1960. From 1961 to 1964 he studied art education at the Hochschule der Künste (HDK) in Berlin, which he passed with the state examination as an art teacher in 1964, and American studies and Finnish at the Freie Universität Berlin. In between, in 1962, he was a guest student at the Ateneum in Helsinki in the field of graphics with Aukusti Tuhka (August Tuhkanen). His first solo exhibition also took place at this time.

From 1965 to 1966 he stayed in the United States on a scholarship from the German Academic Exchange Service (DAAD) and studied at Columbia University in New York and at the renowned Pratt Institute. During this time he made acquaintances with Rudolf Arnheim, Allan Kaprow, Marcel Breuer and Richard Tuttle, developed basic plastic structures for room segments and was able to realize the UMBILDER-ROTARIES exhibition in the Goethe House Gallery in New York in 1966.

External links
Personal site

References 

1940 births
Living people
People from Aachen
German video artists
People from the Rhine Province
Academic staff of the Technical University of Berlin